Tähti Alver (born 4 December 1994) is an Estonian triple jumper and long jumper.

Alver represented Estonia in the 2018 European Athletics Championships in Berlin where she finished 22nd with 13.76m. In 2019 European Athletics Indoor Championships in Glasgow she finished 14th with 13.39m. Alver is 6 time Estonian champion - 4 times in triple jump and 2 times in long jump. She is holding all-time 4th place in triple jump and all-time 5th place in long jump in Estonia.

Personal bests
 Triple jump: 14.05m (+0.9 m/s), 18 July 2018 (Tallinn)
 Triple jump (indoor): 13.75m, 10 February 2018 (Tallinn)
 Long jump: 6.54m (+1.9 m/s), 9 August 2020 (Tallinn)
 Long jump (indoor): 6.36m, 18 February 2018 (Tallinn)

Major competition record

References

External links

1994 births
Living people
Sportspeople from Tartu
Estonian female triple jumpers
Estonian female long jumpers
21st-century Estonian women